John Rae (21 June 1895 - 4 June 1977) was a Scottish actor.

He appeared in films like I Know Where I'm Going! (1945), The Big Chance (1957), Morgan – A Suitable Case for Treatment (1966) and Oh! What a Lovely War (1969).

Selected filmography

 Neutral Port (1940) - (uncredited)
 Tawny Pipit (1944) - Mr. Dougal
 One Exciting Night (1944) - Scottish Official (uncredited)
 Soldier, Sailor (1944) - Chief Engineer
 He Snoops to Conquer (1945) - (uncredited)
 I Know Where I'm Going! (1945) - Old Shepherd
 Green for Danger (1947) - The Porter
 So Well Remembered (1947) - Man in Street (uncredited)
 Bonnie Prince Charlie (1948) - Duncan
 The Brave Don't Cry (1952) - Donald Sloan
 The Story of Gilbert and Sullivan (1953) - Ferguson
 Johnny on the Run (1953) - Radio Salesman
 The Heart of the Matter (1953) - Loder (uncredited)
 The Kidnappers (US: The Little Kidnappers, 1953) - Andrew McCleod
 The Maggie (1954) - The Constable
 Escapade (1955) - Curly
 Quatermass 2 (1957) - McLeod
 Manuela (1957) - Ferguson
 The Abominable Snowman (1957) - Yeti-eyes (uncredited)
 The Big Chance (1957) - Mr. Jarvis
 Innocent Sinners (1958) - Mr. Isbister
 A Question of Adultery (1958) - Jury Foreman
 Harry Black and the Tiger (1958) - Fisherman
 The Bridal Path (1959) - Angus
 The Flesh and the Fiends (1960) - Reverend Lincoln (uncredited)
 The Day the Earth Caught Fire (1961) - Sarge the Doorman (uncredited)
 Take Me Over (1963)
 Morgan – A Suitable Case for Treatment (1966) - Judge
 Fahrenheit 451 (1966) - Book Person: 'Weir of Hermiston' (uncredited)
 Oh! What a Lovely War (1969) - Grandpa Smith
 Fragment of Fear (1970) - Uncle Stanley
 Sunday Bloody Sunday (1971) - Airline Doctor
 John Keats: His Life and Death (1973) - First Critic

References

External links

1890s births
1985 deaths
People from Perth, Scotland
Scottish male film actors